Do You Love Your Mom and Her Two-Hit Multi-Target Attacks? is a 2019 anime television series based on the light novel, which was written by Dachima Inaka and illustrated by Pochi Iida. The series was announced at the "Fantasia Bunko Dai Kanshasai 2018" event on October 21, 2018. The series was directed by Yoshiaki Iwasaki and written by Deko Akao, with animation by studio J.C.Staff. Yohei Yaegashi provided the series' character designs. Keiji Inai composed the music. It ran for 12 episodes from July 13 to September 28, 2019, on Tokyo MX and other channels. Spira Spica performed the series' opening theme song , while Ai Kayano performed the series' ending theme song . An additional OVA episode is bundled with the series' sixth Blu-ray volume, which was released on March 25, 2020. Aniplex of America has licensed the series. 


Episode list

Notes

References

External links 
  
 
 
 

Do You Love Your Mom and Her Two-Hit Multi-Target Attacks?